Yunque may refer to:

People 
Carlos Irizarry Yunqué, Associate Justice of the Supreme Court of Puerto Rico
Edgardo Vega Yunqué (1936–2008), Puerto Rican novelist and short-story writer

Places 
El Yunque National Forest, a forest located in northeastern Puerto Rico
El Yunque (organization), a former secret society of Mexican origin
El Yunque (Cuba), a table-top shaped mountain in Cuba
El Yunque (Puerto Rico), a mountain in Puerto Rico
Paco Yunque, a children's story originally written in Spanish by Peruvian poet César Vallejo

Other uses 
El Yunque least gecko, is a species of lizard in the family Sphaerodactylidae